Hunin was a Palestinian Arab village in the Galilee Panhandle part of Mandatory Palestine close to the Lebanese border. It was the second largest village in the district of Safed, but was depopulated in 1948. The inhabitants of this village were, similar to the inhabitants of Southern Lebanon, Shia Muslims.

History

Iron Age I to Late Byzantine period
The first settlement at the site dates back to Iron Age I (1200-1000 BCE), followed by renewed habitation from the Persian period (586-332 BCE) until the latter part of the Byzantine period (5th-6th centuries CE).

Crusader and Mamluk periods

The castle named in Frankish chronicles as Chastel Neuf (in medieval French) or Castellum Novum (in Latin), and known as Qal'at Hunin in Arabic, and as (Horvat) Mezudat Hunin in Modern Hebrew, was built in two phases by the Crusaders during the 12th and 13th centuries (1105–7, 1178 and 1240) and refortified by Mamluk sultan Baibars in 1266. The moat is the only well-visible Crusader feature left, with very little of the medieval structures being preserved.

Ottoman period
The castle was rebuilt in the 18th century by Zahir al-Umar, Bedouin ruler of the Galilee in the time between the 1730s until 1775. The castle's 18th-century vaulted gatehouse is the most conspicuous structure still standing. This is the time when the Shi'a village of Hunin began developing near the castle.

In 1752, a mosque was constructed in Hunin. The dedicatory inscription has been tentatively read as saying that the prayer house was consecrated to Ja'far al-Sadiq, the sixth Shia Imam.

The village was badly damaged in the earthquake of 1837, according to Edward Robinson who visited in 1856. In 1875, Victor Guérin visited Hunin.

In 1881, the PEF's Survey of Western Palestine described Hunin as "[a] village, built of stone, joining on to ruined Crusading castle [..], and containing about 100 Moslems. The situation is on a low ridge just before the hills drop down to the east to the Huleh Valley; the hills round are uncultivated, covered with low scrub, but in the valleys there is some arable land. Water is obtained from numerous cisterns; a birket [pool, reservoir] and spring to the south-east."

British Mandate period
The Syria-Lebanon-Palestine boundary was a product of the post-World War I Anglo-French partition of Ottoman Syria. British forces had advanced to a position at Tel Hazor against Turkish troops in 1918 and wished to incorporate all the sources of the River Jordan within British-controlled Palestine. Following the Paris Peace Conference of 1919, and the unratified and later annulled Treaty of Sèvres, stemming from the San Remo conference, the 1920 boundary extended the British-controlled area to north of the Sykes-Picot line, a straight line between the midpoint of the Sea of Galilee and Nahariya. The international boundary between Palestine and Lebanon was finally agreed upon by Great Britain and France in 1923, in conjunction with the Treaty of Lausanne, after Britain had been given a League of Nations mandate for Palestine in 1922.

In April 1924, Hunin and six other Shiite villages, and an estimated 20 other settlements, were transferred from the French Mandate of Lebanon to the British Mandate of Palestine by France.

In the 1931 census of Palestine, the population of Hunin was 1,075, all Muslims, in a total of 233 houses.

In the 1945 statistics the population of Hunin (with Hula and Udeisa) was 1620 Muslims, with a total of 14,224 dunams of land. Of this, Arabs used 859 for plantations and irrigated land, 5,987 dunums were allocated to grain farming, while 81 dunams were classified as urban land.

In 1945, Kibbutz Misgav Am was established on what was traditionally the northern part of village land.

1948 and aftermath
A Palmach raid in May 1948 led to many of the inhabitants fleeing to Lebanon, leaving 400 in the village. Four village women were raped and murdered by Israeli soldiers during the summer. 

During a meeting in August 1948, the mukhtars of Hunin and other Shi'ite villages met with the Jews of kibbutz Kfar Giladi, declaring their willingness to be good citizens of Israel. Their proposal was conveyed to the Israeli government, where it received enthusiastic support from the Minorities Minister Bechor-Shalom Sheetrit. A report was made by the Ministry of Minority Affairs recommending that such an agreement be reached with the 4,700 or so Shi'ites in the region to promote friendly relations with southern Lebanon, to take advantage of the Shi'ites' poor relationship with the majority Sunnis, and to enhance the prospect of a future extension of the border. This proposal was not accepted, despite the support of the Minister of Minority Affairs, Sheetrit. In August, more inhabitants of Hunin were forced to flee by the IDF. On 3 September 1948, the IDF raided the village blowing up 20 houses, killing a son of the mukhtar and 19 others and expelling the remaining villagers. Most of the villagers took refuge in Shiite villages in Lebanon.

In 1951, Moshav Margaliot was established just south of the village site.

See also
 Hula massacre (31 October - 1 November 1948) perpetrated by the IDF in Hula, a Lebanese Shi'a village 3 km from Hunin
 Shia villages in Palestine

References

Bibliography

 
 
 

 
 

p. 49

External links
Welcome to Hunin at PalestineRemembered.com
Hunin, Zochrot
Hunin, Villages of Palestine
Survey of Western Palestine, map 2: IAA, Wikimedia commons
Hunin, from the Khalil Sakakini Cultural Center

Arab villages depopulated during the 1948 Arab–Israeli War
Massacres in Israel during the Israeli–Palestinian conflict
District of Safad